Jones Branch is a stream in Crawford County in the U.S. state of Missouri. It is a tributary of Crooked Creek.

Jones Branch was named after Sam Jones, an early citizen.

See also
List of rivers of Missouri

References

Rivers of Crawford County, Missouri
Rivers of Missouri